The M22 is a short metropolitan route in Johannesburg, South Africa.

Route 
The M22 begins at the M1 and ends at the M71.

References 

Streets and roads of Johannesburg
Metropolitan routes in Johannesburg